Timothy Wang is an American table tennis player. He competed at the 2012 Summer Olympics in the Men's singles, but was defeated in the preliminary round. Wang won the men's singles at the 2010 US National Championships and repeated his victory in 2012 and 2013. He also won the national championship in men's doubles in 2011 and 2012 (with Han Xiao) and in mixed doubles in 2011, 2012 and 2013 (with Ariel Hsing).  He represented the United States in the men's team table tennis event at the 2016 Summer Olympics.

Wang's parents are both immigrants from Taiwan.

References

American male table tennis players
American sportspeople of Taiwanese descent
Living people
Olympic table tennis players of the United States
Table tennis players at the 2012 Summer Olympics
Table tennis players at the 2016 Summer Olympics
1991 births
Table tennis players at the 2015 Pan American Games
Pan American Games competitors for the United States